Płotka or Plotka is a Polish surname. Notable people with the surname include: 

 Michał Płotka (born 1988), Polish footballer
 Wolfgang Plotka (born 1941), German ice hockey player

See also 
 Płotkowo
 Plotkin

Polish-language surnames